The Battle of San Pietro, also known as the Battle of Crocetta or the Battle of Parma was a battle fought on 29 June 1734 between troops of France and Sardinia on one side, and Habsburg Austrian troops on the other, as part of the War of Polish Succession, between the village of La Crocetta and the city of Parma, then in the Duchy of Parma.  Austrian troops assaulted an entrenched Franco-Sardinian position, and were ultimately repulsed, due in part to the death of their commander, Florimund Mercy, and the wounding of his second in command, Frederick of Württemberg.  Both sides suffered significant casualties in the battle, which lasted for most of the day.

Background

Following the death in February 1733 of King Augustus II of Poland, European powers exerted diplomatic and military influence in the selection of his successor.  Competing elections in August and October 1733 elected Stanisław Leszczyński and Frederick August, Elector of Saxony to be the next king.  Stanisław was supported primarily by France, while Frederick August was supported by Russia and the Habsburg Emperor Charles VI.  On October 10, France declared war on Austria and Saxony to draw military strength away from Poland, and shortly thereafter invaded both the Rhineland and the Habsburg territories in what is now northern Italy.  The Italian campaign was conducted in conjunction with King Charles Emmanuel III of Sardinia, to whom France had promised the Duchy of Milan in the Treaty of Turin, signed in September 1733.

Allies take Milan
Starting in October 1733, a combined Franco-Sardinian army, numbering over 40,000 and led by Charles Emmanuel, rapidly took control of Milanese territory without significant opposition from the roughly 12,000 Austrian troops defending the duchy. After the conquest of Tortona in February 1734, the fighting season slowed and the army camped for the winter.

The army was joined in November 1733 by the 81-year-old French Marshal de Villars.  He and Charles Emmanuel disagreed on strategy, as the latter, distrustful of the French, wanted to secure Milan for himself, while Villars wanted to secure the southern ends of the passes through the Alps to prevent Austrian reinforcements from reaching Italy.  Charles Emmanuel's tactics including deliberately delaying military movements that were unfavorable to his aims.  Frustrated by these tactics, Villars asked to be recalled in May 1734.  En route to France, he fell ill, and died in Turin in June.  The French troops in the army were then placed under the command of generals de Broglie and Coigny, who were made Marshal.

Late in June 1734, Charles Emmanuel returned to Turin, because his wife Polyxena of Hesse-Rotenburg was sick. He asked the French marshals to avoid engaging in offensive actions until he returned, although this was likely another delaying tactic on his part.

Austrian campaign

In response to the allied seizure of Milan, Austria organized a relief army.  Due to Charles Emmanuel's insistence on completely securing Milanese territory, some Austrian troops were able to cross the Alps to the stronghold of Mantua as early as November 1733, bringing the troop strength there to about 7,000.  By the end of the year the garrison had swollen to 12,000, mostly due to troops pulling out of Milanese strongholds.  Frederick of Württemberg established patrols along the Po and Oglio Rivers to monitor allied movements in January 1734, and fortified the Tyrolean border with Milan.  By March the army's size had risen to 24,000, and Field Marshal Florimund Mercy had taken command of the forces.  He continued to maintain a defensive posture, as he thought that offensive action would leave either Mantua or the Tyrolean border too weakly defended.  It was not until early April that the Austrian army began marching out to face the allies, massing along the Mincio River.  Prince Eugene of Savoy, in a letter dated April 26, ordered Mercy to begin the campaign; total Austrian forces in northern Italy had grown to more than 55,000.

On 1 May the left wing of the Austrian army began crossing the Po River, forcing the French detachments on the southern bank to retreat toward Parma.  Throughout May, that wing, commanded by Frederick of Württemberg, moved upriver toward Parma, while the right wing, under Marshal Mercy, moved more slowly, delayed by the need for provisions and a stroke suffered by the aging Mercy, that deprived him of his sight.  On 1 June Frederick dislodged a detachment of French troops that were stationed to protect a bridgehead at Colorno, not far from Parma.  From 3 to 8 June the bulk of the allied army crossed the Po at Sacca to join the defensive position there.  On 4 and 5 June a detachment of Sardinian troops drove the Austrians from Colorno, who retreated to Sorbolo to plan an attack against the allied position at Parma.

Battle
Marshal Coigny determined to make a stand at Parma, and on 28 June established a strong position outside the city walls.  Anchoring his left flank to the city's defenses, he placed the right at the village of Crocetta, where it was further protected by swampy areas of the Taro River.  The road between Crocetta and Parma ran on a causeway, and Coigny had deep trenches dug on either side of the road.

Marshal Mercy crossed the Taro canal at the head of his army and at about 10 am fired on the French advance posts, who withdrew. On reaching Crocetta, Mercy ordered Frederick, who had command of the Austrian left, to attack without delay. The Prince objected that he first had to cross more troops over the river and align them. Then Mercy said "Je vous laisse faire et je ferai la chose à ma mode (Do what you want, I will do it my way)" and led the right into battle.  His troops began advancing, filling in the trenches with fascines amid a withering bombardment by the allies.  The first wave was repulsed, but Mercy persisted in the attack, ordering fresh regiments into the assault.  They continued to work filling the trenches, using the piled bodies of their comrades in the effort.  They were about to take the first French line when Mercy was struck and killed by a musket ball, creating confusion and disorder within the lines.

Frederick then arrived to take command and restore order.  The Austrians gained control of the causeway and began filling the trench on the other side, this time using the accumulated bodies of their enemies.  Frederick had two horses shot out under him, and eventually withdrew from the battle with a minor wound.  Hotwever, the Austrians persisted in the attack, driving the French to the walls of Parma amid continued heavy fighting.  There the French made a desperate stand, and successfully stopped the Austrian advance.  The Austrians then withdrew to the south after the onset of darkness.

Aftermath

The Austrians lost 6,172 killed and wounded, including Marshal Mercy and 6 generals. There were also a great many deserters. The French lost 4,000 killed and wounded and the Sardinians 400.  While the allies held the battlefield, it was not considered a great victory due to the heavy casualties.

Frederick found refuge in the Montechiarugolo castle, where he wrote a report of the battle to the emperor, blaming the failure on Mercy's recklessness.  The Austrians eventually retreated to the Secchia River, where they were joined in July by reinforcements and a new leader, Field Marshal Königsegg.  There was little significant conflict as the two armies faced each other across the Secchia until September, when Königsegg began a series of moves that culminated in the Austrian defeat at Guastalla, again with heavy casualties, on September 19, after which the Austrians retreated to the Oglio River, a position they maintained for the rest of the year.

The battle was witnessed by the population of Parma and in particular by Venetian playwright Carlo Goldoni, who happened to be in the city.

Sources
 History of the house of Austria, Volume 3, William Coxe (1889)
 Martin's history of France: The decline of the French monarchy, Volume 1, Henri Martin, translated by Mary Louise Booth (1866)
 la battaglia di Parma Atti del Congresso Internazionale di Scienze Storiche, du Prof. Dott. Ludovico Oberziner (1906)
 Parma Edition Quaderni Parmensi, de Gianfranco Stella (1988)
 Parma e Vienna Edition Artegrafica Silva - Parma, de Adele Vittoria Marchi (1988)
 la battaglia di San Pietro Edition Aurea Parma, de Giancarlo Gonizzi (2004)
 Die Schlacht bei Parma (in German)

San Pietro
San Pietro
San Pietro
Conflicts in 1734
1734 in Austria
1734 in France
San Pietro
History of Parma
1734 in Italy
Duchy of Parma